Timothy Roberts Young (November 19, 1811 – May 12, 1898) was an American attorney, farmer, and politician. He served as a U.S. Representative from Illinois in the late 1840s and early 1850s.

Early life and career
Born in Dover, New Hampshire, Young completed preparatory studies and attended Phillips Exeter Academy. He graduated from Bowdoin College in Brunswick, Maine in 1835. He studied law in Dover and was admitted to the bar in 1838. Young moved to Marshall, Illinois in the spring of 1838 and practiced law for ten years.

He was elected as a Democratic United States Representative to the Thirty-first Congress, serving the third district of Illinois. Young served from March 4, 1849, to March 3, 1851. He served on the House Committee on Public Lands.

After leaving Congress, he moved to Mattoon, Illinois, and became interested in the manufacture of plug tobacco, in which he worked for ten years as a wholesale tobacco merchant. He was involved in the railroad and engaged in agricultural pursuits near Casey, Illinois. He served a delegate to the Illinois state constitutional convention from Clark County in 1862.

Personal life
Young married Margarette E. Jones in 1852. They had three children, Fanny Jones Young, Kimball Young, and Ellen Swepson Young.

Death
Young died in Oilfield, Illinois, near Casey, Illinois, on May 12, 1898 (age 86 years, 174 days). He is interred in Marshall Cemetery in Marshall, Illinois.

References

External links

1811 births
1898 deaths
Phillips Exeter Academy alumni
Bowdoin College alumni
People from Casey, Illinois
People from Mattoon, Illinois
People from Dover, New Hampshire
Democratic Party members of the United States House of Representatives from Illinois
Businesspeople from Illinois
Farmers from Illinois
Illinois lawyers
New Hampshire lawyers
19th-century American politicians
19th-century American lawyers